The Grading Open Service Interface Definition (OSID) is an Open Knowledge Initiative specification. OSIDs are programmatic interfaces which comprise a Service Oriented Architecture for designing and building reusable and interoperable software.

The Grading OSID supports characterizing, storing, and retrieving Grades. A Grade is specified with four elements:

 a GradeValue
 a GradeType
 a GradeScale
 a ScoringDefinition

These four elements provide a general and flexible way to characterize a Grade. This service also provides for managing GradeRecords, which join information about the Grade', the Agent whose Grade it is, and the object that was graded. This service also includes methods for iterating through GradeTypes, GradeScales, and ScoringDefinitions supported by a particular service provider implementation. 

The Grading OSID is related to the Assessment OSID. Assessment concerns the definition, management, and evaluation of question-oriented materials. Assessment can be used as the gradable object referenced in the Grading OSID.

Software architecture